Marie-Morgane Dessart (born 1990) is a visually impaired Belgian alpine skier. She represented Belgium in Paralympic alpine skiing at the World Cup and World Cup, where she won a bronze medal.

Career 
At the 2014/2015 World Championships in Panorama, Canada, Dessart placed 4th in the giant slalom category VI visually impaired with a time of 2:44.51.  Two years later, at the 2016/2017 World Championships in Tarvisio, she finished ninth in both the giant slalom and the special slalom, with a time of 3:06.82.

In the 2014/2015 IPC Alpine Ski World Cup , VI B3 category, Dessart led by Antoine Marine Francois finished 3rd in the slalom with a time of 2:29.51.

At the 2016 Europa Cup, she won a bronze medal, behind Noemi Ristau, and Eleonor Sana.

References 

1990 births
Living people
Paralympic alpine skiers
Paralympic alpine skiers of Belgium